The Roman Catholic Diocese of Grenoble–Vienne-les-Allobroges (Latin: Diocesis Gratianopolitana–Viennensis Allobrogum; French: Diocèse de Grenoble–Vienne-les-Allobroges) is a diocese of the Latin Church of the Roman Catholic Church in south-eastern France. The diocese, erected in the 4th century as the Diocese of Grenoble, comprises the department of Isère and the former canton of Villeurbanne (Rhône), in the Region of Rhône-Alpes. In 2006, the name was changed from the diocese of Grenoble to the diocese of Grenoble–Vienne. The current bishop is Jean-Marc Eychenne, appointed on September 14, 2022.

Before the French Revolution it was a suffragan diocese of the Archbishopric of Vienne and included the deanery or see at Savoy, which in 1779, was made a bishopric in its own right, with the episcopal seat at Chambéry.

By the Concordat of 1801, the bishop of Grenoble was made a suffragan of the Archdiocese of Lyon. Thirteen archipresbyterates of the former Archdiocese of Vienne were affiliated to the Diocese of Grenoble, and there were annexed to it some parishes from the then Diocese of Belley (now Diocese of Belley-Ars), the Diocese of Gap, the Archdiocese of Lyon, and the Diocese of Valence.

Bishops

Some historically important bishops of Grenoble were:

 Saint Domninus, the first Bishop of Grenoble known to history, attended the Council of Aquileia in 381.  
 Saint Ceratus (441–452), celebrated in legend for his controversies against Arianism
 Saint Ferreolus (at the end of the seventh century), who, according to tradition, was killed by a pagan while preaching
 Saint Hugh of Grenoble (1080–1132), noted for his zeal in carrying out Pope Gregory VII's orders concerning reform and for his opposition to the Bishop of Vienne, later Pope Callixtus II
 Pierre Scarron (1621–1667), who, with the co-operation of many religious orders, restored Catholicism in Dauphiné
 Étienne Le Camus (1671–1707), organizer of charitable loan associations
 Jean de Caulet (1726–1771), who brought about general acceptance of the Bull Unigenitus, whose collection of books was the nucleus of the public library of the city, and during whose episcopate Bridaine, the preacher, after delivering a sermon on almsgiving went through the streets of the city with wagons and was unable to gather all the donations of linen, furniture and clothing that were offered.

History

The Benedictines and Augustinians founded at an early date numerous priories in the diocese, that of Vizille dating from 994, but during St. Hugh's episcopal administration, monastic life attained a fuller development. The chapter-abbey of Saint-Martin de Miséré, whence originated many Augustinian priories, and the school of the priory of Villard Benoît at Pontcharra, were important during twelfth and thirteenth centuries. But the peculiar monastic foundation of Dauphiné, contemporaneous with St. Hugh's regime, was that of the Carthusians under St. Bruno of Cologne in 1084. The Frères du Saint-Esprit, who during the Middle Ages were scattered broadcast through the Diocese of Grenoble, did much to inculcate among the people habits of mutual assistance.

The two sojourns at Grenoble in 1598 and 1600 respectively by Cotton, the Jesuit, later confessor to Henry IV of France, were prolific of some notable conversions from Protestantism; in memory of this the Constable de Lesdiguières, himself a convert in 1622, favoured the founding at Grenoble of a celebrated Jesuit house. In 1651 a college was established in connexion with the residence, and here Vaucanson, the well-known mechanician, studied. In 1700 the institution included theological courses in its curriculum.

From the first half of the thirteenth century the French branch of the Waldenses had its chief seat in Dauphiné, from which country emanated Guillaume Farel, the most captivating preacher of the French Reformation. Pierre de Sébiville, an apostate Franciscan friar, introduced Protestantism into Grenoble in 1522. The diocese was sorely tried by the wars of religion, especially in 1562, when the cruel Baron des Andrets acted as the Prince de Condé's lieutenant-general in Dauphiné.

Pope Pius VI, when taken a prisoner to France, spent two days at Grenoble in 1799. Pius VII, in turn was kept in close confinement in the prefecture of Grenoble from 21 July until 2 August 1808, Bishop Simon not being permitted even to visit him.

The following saints may be mentioned as natives of what constitutes the present Diocese of Grenoble: St. Amatus, the anchorite (sixth century), founder of the Abbey of Remiremont, and St. Peter, Archbishop of Tarantaise (1102–1174), a Cistercian, born in the ancient Archdiocese of Vienne. Moreover, it was in the chapel of the superior ecclesiastical seminary of Grenoble that J.-B. Vianney, the future Curé of Ars, was ordained a priest, 13 August 1815. The Bishopric of Grenoble is in possession of an almost complete account of the pastoral visits made between 1339 and 1970, a palæographical record perhaps unique of its kind in France.

The principal places of pilgrimage in the present Diocese of Grenoble are: Notre-Dame de Parménie, near Rivers, re-established in the seventeenth century at the instance of a shepherdess; Notre-Dame de l'Osier, at Vinay, which dates from 1649, and Our Lady of La Salette, which owes its origin to the apparition of the Virgin, 19 September 1846, to Maximin Giraud and Mélanie Calvat, the devotion to Notre-Dame de la Salette being authorized by Bishop Bruillard, 1 May 1852.

Before the enforcement of the law of 1901 there were in the Diocese of Grenoble Assumptionists, Olivétans, Capuchins, Regular Canons of the Immaculate Conception, Oblates of Mary Immaculate, Fathers of Holy Ghost and the Holy Heart of Mary, Brothers of the Cross of Jesus, Brothers of the Holy Family, Brothers of the Christian Schools and Brothers of the Sacred Heart. The diocesan congregations of women were: the Sisters of Our Lady of the Holy Rosary, devoted to hospital work and teaching, and founded by Cathiard, who, after having been an officer under Napoleon, died Archpriest of Pont de Beauvoisin; the Sisters of Providence of Corenc, founded in 1841, devoted to hospital duty and teaching (mother-house at St. Marcellin), and the Sisters of Our Lady of the Cross, likewise devoted to hospital and educational work, founded in 1832 (mother-house at Murinais).

See also 
 Catholic Church in France
 Severus of Vienne

References

Sources
 pp. 548–549. (Use with caution; obsolete)
  p. 301. (in Latin)
 p. 175.

 p. 219.

External links
  Centre national des Archives de l'Église de France, L'Épiscopat francais depuis 1919, retrieved: 2016-12-24.

Acknowledgment
 

Grenoble
 
4th-century establishments in Roman Gaul